Jean-François Tordo (born 1 August 1964 in Nice) is a French former rugby union player. He played for Nice, RC Toulonnais, Bourgoin, and for the France national team.

Tordo made his international début for France on 13 July 1991, against the United States at Denver. He won 15 caps from 1991 to 1993, without scoring. Unusually, he played as a flanker (nine caps), number eight (once), and  hooker (five caps). He captained France six times, including leading them to win the Five Nations Championship in 1993.

Honours 
 Five Nations Championship: 1993
 French championship: 1987
 French championship finalist: 1983 and 1989

External links
ESPN profile

1964 births
Living people
French rugby union players
Rugby union flankers
France international rugby union players
Rugby Nice Côte d'Azur players